Daniel James Marsh (born 14 June 1973) is a former Australian cricketer who captained the Tasmanian Tigers. The son of former late Australian keeper Rod Marsh, he was a right-handed batsman and a handy slow left-arm orthodox bowler. He played for the South Australia early on in his career and played County Cricket for Leicestershire County Cricket Club.

Dan Marsh was a powerful striker of the ball and was capable of occupying the crease for long periods. He led the Tasmanians to just their second ever trophy when they won the 2004–05 ING Cup. He contributed a half century in the final. As Tasmania's stand-in captain in the absence of Australian Test cricket captain Ricky Ponting, Marsh led Tasmania to its maiden Pura Cup final win in 2006–07, and also captained the Tigers to their third domestic one-day trophy when they won the Ford Ranger Cup in 2007–08.

Whilst Ricky Ponting was officially the Tasmanian cricket captain from 2001/02 until he announced he was standing down on 21 November 2007, this was primarily a ceremonial appointment in order to have the Australian captain as Tasmanian captain as well. In effect Marsh, his vice-captain, performed the captaincy duties on most occasions, and was appointed outright following Ponting standing aside. He retired from First Class Cricket at the end of the 2009–10 Australian domestic season.

References

External links

1973 births
Living people
Tasmania cricketers
Leicestershire cricketers
People educated at Christ Church Grammar School
South Australia cricketers
Australian cricketers
Cricketers from Perth, Western Australia
Australian cricket coaches